Nusaybin station is a railway station in the town of Nusaybin in Turkey next to the Turkey–Syria border. The station is the easternmost station in Turkey on the Baghdad Railway. The station was opened on 25 October 1918 by the Baghdad Railway. The station has no passenger service.

References

Railway stations in Mardin Province
Railway stations opened in 1918
Buildings and structures in Mardin Province
Transport in Mardin Province